"She's Dope" is the title of a song by Canadian band Down with Webster. It was released in May 2011 as the first single from their album, Time to Win, Vol. 2. The song debuted on the Canadian Hot 100 at number 52 and peaked at number 18.

Background
A previous version of "She's Dope" was released in October 2010 in a 360-degrees music video in the Doritos Late Night interactive global music event via the Doritos Late Night website. The website also featured 360-degrees music videos for six other artists including Rihanna and Professor Green.

"She's Dope" is written by band members Tyler Armes, Cameron Hunter, Patrick Gillett, Martin Seja and Andrew Martino.

The song was nominated for "Video of the Year" and "MuchFact Indie Video of the Year" at the 2012 MuchMusic Video Awards.

Music video
A music video for "She's Dope" was filmed in April 2011 and was directed by Aaron A. This is the third collaboration between Down with Webster and Aaron A, after he directed the videos for "Your Man" and "Whoa Is Me". Aaron A talked about the concept of the video saying, "the concept is kind of all around this dream world and one particular dope girl." Fashion model, Genevieve Pantano, is featured as the omnipresent girl.

MuchMusic's TV show, New.Music.Live said that in the video the band combines "elements of a performance video with some trippy dream sequence sets and fish eye lenses."

The music video premiered on New.Music.Live on MuchMusic on May 17, 2011. The music video for "She's Dope" debuted at #30 on the MuchMusic Countdown on the week of May 26, 2011. It peaked at number 1 on the week of August 11, 2011.

Chart performance
"She's Dope" debuted on the Canadian Hot 100 at number 52 on the week of June 11, 2011, and peaked at number 18 on the week of July 9, 2011. The song has spent a total of 11 weeks on the Canadian Hot 100. The song was the Greatest Gainer on the week July 9, 2011. "She's Dope" also peaked at #10 on the Digital Singles chart on the week of June 29, 2011.

Live Performances
"She's Dope" was performed live by Down with Webster at the 2011 MuchMusic Video Awards on June 19, 2011.

Track listing

Charts and certifications

Weekly charts

Year-end charts

Certifications

References

External links
 

2011 singles
Down with Webster songs
Universal Motown Records singles
Music videos directed by Aaron A
2011 songs